Elysium, located in the Elysium and Cebrenia quadrangles, is the second largest volcanic region on Mars, after Tharsis. The region includes the volcanoes (from north to south) Hecates Tholus, Elysium Mons and Albor Tholus. Another large volcano, Apollinaris Mons, lies south of Elysium Planitia and is not part of the province. Besides having large volcanoes, Elysium has several areas with long trenches, called fossa or fossae (plural) on Mars. They include the Cerberus Fossae, Elysium Fossae, Galaxias Fossae, Hephaestus Fossae, Hyblaeus Fossae, Stygis Fossae and Zephyrus Fossae.

Composition 
The southeastern portion of the province is geochemically distinct from the northwest.  The southeast is composed of sedimentary and porous rocks.  The majority of the southeastern portion is made up of Amazonian-Hesperian volcanic units.  Most of the remaining southeastern volcanic units are late Amazonian in nature.  In recent history, there were significant groundwater deposits in the region.

It has been hard to study the composition of this province, due to the layer of dust that sits on top of the crust.  Investigations in relatively dust-free regions indicate that it is made primarily of high-calcium pyroxene and olivine.  To a lesser degree, the province is made up of hematite and hydrated silica, among other things.  There are no strong magnetic fields in the region.  There are some extant near-surface glacial deposits in the caldera of Hecates Tholus, a volcano in the province.

Formation 
The southeastern portion of the province is approximately 0.85 billion years younger than the northwestern.  The region as a whole has been volcanically active for at least 3.9 billion years, with a peak 2.2 billion years ago, although activity has decreased considerably in the last billion years.  Crater counting done on the lava flows in the southern region show low cratering rates, which would indicate younger volcanic activity, as recent as 10 Myr. The most recent volcanic activity dates to 2 million years ago.  The southeastern portion overlaps with Cerberus Fossae; features in this region are thought to have formed due to volcanic and water-related processes, such as phreatomagmatism, relict ice flows, and interactions between lava and water.  In general, many flow units in Elysium Planitia (such as Rahway Valles and Marte Vallis) are thought to have their origins in lava originating from this region.

Hecates Tholus erupted ~350 million years ago, with glacial deposits in the resulting caldera dating between 5 and 24 million years ago.  Craters in the region are not generally typical of impacts; rather, they are thought to have formed due to explosive volcanism or collapse due to subsurface lava withdrawal.

Elysium contains numerous lava flow units with variable histories as well as volcanic and fluvial channels.The three major volcanoes of the region sit on top of a 1700 x 2400 km broad dome.  The summit of Hecates Tholus shows evidence of pyroclastic activity. Martian volcanism has been dominated by effusive eruption styles and there is limited evidence to support widespread explosive or pyroclastic volcanic eruptions on Mars.

Elysium Mons is approximately 1.5 times as steep as any other Martian volcano at approximately 7-7.5°. The caldera at the summit of Elysium Mons is approximately 13.5 km in diameter. Extending past the rim of this central caldera are at least 18 sinuous channels thought to be the remnants of collapsed lava tubes and lava channels.

Observation history 
The Elysium volcanic province was first noticed as a distinct Martian region as a result of data obtained from the Mariner 9 mission, in the 1970s.  The Viking orbiter noted that volcanic province of Elysium experienced more diverse types of volcanism than the Tharsis volcanic region.  In 2004, ESA's Mars Express orbiter's HRSC observed the volcanoes in the region.  The InSight Lander landed just south of the province in 2018, in Elysium Planitia, and has detected marsquakes emanating from this region.  The main science goals of the lander are to monitor the level of seismic activity occurring on Mars and to understand how Mars formed and how the planet has been evolving ever since.

Volcanoes of Elysium

Troughs (fossae) in Elysium

See also
 Fossa (geology) 
 Geography of Mars
 Geology of Mars
 List of quadrangles on Mars
 Volcanism on Mars

Notes

References

External links
Google Mars - zoomable map centered on Elysium Planitia, with three main volcanoes of Elysium visible
google mars - Cerebrus Fossae fissures

Volcanoes of Mars
Mountains on Mars
Surface features of Mars
Lava plateaus